Nazir Naji (b. 15 August 1937 is a Pakistani senior journalist and Urdu columnist. He served 27 years for Daily Jang as a senior Urdu columnist.

Career
Nazir Naji was formerly a chairman of the Pakistan Academy of Letters. In 2012, Naji left Jang Group and joined Daily Dunya as a Group Editor. He has been honored by Hilal-i-Imtiaz for his services in journalism.

Awards and recognition
Hilal-i-Imtiaz (Crescent of Excellence) in 2012 by the President of Pakistan.

References

1965 births
Living people
Recipients of Hilal-i-Imtiaz
Pakistani male journalists
Pakistani columnists
Urdu-language columnists
Place of birth missing (living people)